The following is a list of centrist political parties. It includes centre to centre-right parties, such as the Free Democratic Party (Germany) and centre to centre-left parties like Liberal Democrats (UK), but not centre-right parties like the Christian Democratic Union of Germany or centre-left parties like Social Democratic Party of Germany.

Active

A 

Apsny
Party for the Economic Development of Abkhazia
People's Party of Abkhazia

Basej-e Milli
National Congress Party of Afghanistan
National Islamic Movement of Afghanistan
Truth and Justice

Åland Centre
Future of Åland
Liberals for Åland

Environmentalist Agrarian Party
Liberal Democratic Union
Libra Party
Sfida për Shqipërinë
Unity for Human Rights Party

Algerian National Party
Democratic National Rally
Future Front

Andorra for Change

Anguilla Progressive Movement
Anguilla United Front

United Progressive Party

Federal Consensus
Christian Democratic Party
Federal Party
Juntos por el Cambio
Civic Coalition ARI
Democratic Progressive Party
Integration and Development Movement
Radical Civic Union
Liberal Party of Corrientes
Neighbourhood Action Movement
Neuquén People's Movement
Renewal Front (Frente de Todos)
Salta Identity Party
We Are All Chubut
We Do for Córdoba

Apricot Country Party
Armenian Constructive Party (Free Homeland Alliance)
Armenian Liberal Party
Armenian National Congress
Civil Contract
European Party of Armenia
Free Democrats
Hanrapetutyun Party
Heritage
National Democratic Union
New Country
New Times
One Armenia Party (Armenia Alliance)
ORO Alliance
Shirinyan-Babajanyan Alliance of Democrats
Social Justice Party
Unified Armenians Party

Artsakh Revolutionary Party
Generation of Independence Party
New Artsakh Alliance
United Armenia Party

Advance SA
Australian Democrats
Australian Progressives
Ban Fracking Fix Crime Protect Water
Centre Alliance
Health Australia Party
Reason Party
Rex Patrick Team
SA-Best
Science Party
Sustainable Australia
Western Australia Party

NEOS – The New Austria and Liberal Forum
Team Carinthia
Volt Austria

National Solidarity Party
Republican Alternative Party
Unity Party

B 

Progressive Liberal Party

Awami League (Grand Alliance)
Liberal Democratic Party
Nationalist Democratic Movement

Republican Party
Party of Freedom and Progress

Christlich Soziale Partei
Humanist Democratic Centre
ProDG
Walloon Rally
Volt Belgium

People's United Party

Cowry Forces for an Emerging Benin

People's Democratic Party

Civic Community
National Unity Front

Bonaire Patriotic Union
Bonaire People's Movement

Democratic Front
Independent Bloc
Movement of Democratic Action
Our Party
Party for Bosnia and Herzegovina
People's European Union of Bosnia and Herzegovina
People's Party Work for Prosperity

Alliance for Progressives
Botswana Congress Party (Umbrella for Democratic Change)
Botswana Democratic Party
Botswana Movement for Democracy

Avante
Brazilian Democratic Movement
Brazilian Social Democracy Party
Christian Labour Party
Cidadania
Green Party
Podemos
Social Democratic Party
Solidariedade
Sustainability Network

Bulgarian Summer
Democratic Bulgaria
Movement for Rights and Freedoms
National Movement for Stability and Progress
People's Voice
Volt Bulgaria
We Continue the Change

Alliance for Democracy and Federation – African Democratic Rally
Union for Progress and Reform

Burundo-African Alliance for Salvation

C 

Khmer Will Party

Alberta Liberal Party
Alberta Party
Ensemble Montréal
Green Party of Prince Edward Island
Liberal Party of Canada
Liberal Party of Newfoundland and Labrador
New Brunswick Liberal Association
Nova Scotia Liberal Party
Prince Edward Island Liberal Party
Manitoba Liberal Party
Neighbourhoods for a Sustainable Vancouver
Ontario Liberal Party
Ontario Moderate Party
Parti équitable
Vision Vancouver
Vrai changement pour Montréal
Yes Vancouver
Yukon Liberal Party

Movement for Democracy
Social Democratic Party

Cayman Islands People's Party

National Unity Party

Amplitude
Democratic Independent Regionalist Party (Chile Vamos)
New Social Pact
Christian Democratic Party
Citizens
Radical Party of Chile (2018)
Radical Party of Chile
United Independents
United Centre

Union of Chinese Nationalists (Unregistered)

Coalition of Hope
Green Alliance
New Liberalism
Social Party of National Unity

Democratic Social Christian Party
National Alliance Party for Unity
Rally for Congolese Democracy

Congolese Movement for Democracy and Integral Development
Rally for Democracy and Social Progress

National Liberation Party

Centre
Croatian Democratic Peasant Party
Croatian People's Party – Liberal Democrats
Croatian Social Liberal Party
Focus
Green Party – Green Alternative
Restart Coalition
Alliance of Primorje-Gorski Kotar
Croatian Peasant Party
Istrian Democratic Assembly
People's Party – Reformists
Zagorje Party
Split Party, The
Youth Action

Christian Democratic Party of Cuba (Banned)

Real Alternative Party
Democratic Party
National People's Party

Citizens' Alliance
Democratic Front
Democratic Party
New Wave – The Other Cyprus

Agrarian Democratic Party (Alliance for the Future)
ANO 2011
Czech National Social Party
Hlas
KDU-ČSL (Spolu)
Liberal-Environmental Party (TOP 09)
Masaryk Democratic Party
Moravané
Party for the Open Society
Pirates and Mayors
Czech Pirate Party
Mayors and Independents
Přísaha
SNK European Democrats
Volt Czech Republic

D 

CenterParty
Christian Democrats
Citizen List, The
Danish Social Liberal Party
Moderates
Schleswig Party
Volt Danmark

United Workers' Party

Dominican Liberation Party
Dominican Revolutionary Party
Modern Revolutionary Party

E 

Democratic Party
People's Liberation Party
Social Democratic Party
Timorese Social Democratic Association

PAIS Alliance
Patriotic Society Party

Al-Wasat Party
Civilization Party
Conference Party (For the Love of Egypt)
Democratic Jihad Party
Egypt Party
Egyptian Current Party
El-Ghad Party (Egypt, Egyptian Front, For the Love of Egypt)
Free Egyptians Party (For the Love of Egypt)
Ghad El-Thawra Party
Human Rights and Citizenship Party (Call of Egypt)
Justice Party (Civil Democratic Movement)
Liberal Egyptian Party
Modern Egypt Party (For the Love of Egypt, Egyptian Front)
National Party of Egypt (Egyptian Front)
Reform and Development Party (Civil Democratic Movement)
Republican People's Party (Egyptian Front)
Strong Egypt Party
Union Party

Christian Democratic Party
National Liberal Party
Nuevas Ideas

Popular Action of Equatorial Guinea

Estonia 200
Estonian Centre Party
Estonian Party for the Future
Estonian Reform Party

African United Democratic Party

Ethiopian Citizens for Social Justice
Ethiopian Democratic Party
Prosperity Party

F 

Progress
Self-Government (Danish Social Liberal Party)

FijiFirst
HOPE

Green League
Centre Party
Citizens' Party
Swedish People's Party of Finland

Christian Democratic and Flemish
Vivant

Agir
Centrist Alliance
Democratic Movement
La République En Marche!
Radical Party
Centrists, The
Ensemble Citoyens
Independent Ecological Movement
Modern Left
New Democrats, The
Nouvelle Action Royaliste
Union of Democrats and Independents
Volt France

Democratic Forces of Guiana

G 

Union of the Gabonese People

Gambia Democratic Congress
People's Progressive Party
United Democratic Party

Citizens
European Georgia — Movement for Liberty
For Georgia
Free Democrats
Georgian Dream
Greens Party of Georgia
Lelo for Georgia
Progress and Freedom (Strength Is in Unity)
Strategy Aghmashenebeli

Free Democratic Party
South Schleswig Voters' Association
Volt Germany

Liberal Party of Gibraltar

Democratic Revival
Democrats
Drachmi Greek Democratic Movement Five Stars
Drassi
Liberal Alliance
Panathinaikos Movement
Party of Friendship, Equality and Peace
Union of Centrists

Democrats
Naleraq

Democratic Party of Guam

Humanist Party of Guatemala

Union of Democratic Forces of Guinea
Union of Republican Forces

Alliance for Change (A Partnership for National Unity)

H 

Christian Movement for a New Haiti
Christian National Union for the Reconstruction of Haiti

Liberal Party of Honduras
Savior Party of Honduras

Alliance for Social and Economic Advancement
Democratic Party (Pro-democracy camp)
Hong Kong Civic Association (Pro-Beijing camp)
Path of Democracy (Pro-Beijing camp)
Professional Commons (Pro-democracy camp)
Third Side (Pro-Beijing camp)

Hungarian Liberal Party
Momentum Movement
New Start

I 

Bright Future
Dawn
Progressive Party

Aam Aadmi Party
All India N.R. Congress
Biju Janata Dal
Desiya Murpokku Dravida Kazhagam
Indian National Congress
Indian National Lok Dal
Maharashtrawadi Gomantak Party
Makkal Needhi Maiam
Nationalist Congress Party
Samajwadi Party
United People's Party Liberal
Makkal Needhi Maiam

Indonesian Democratic Party of Struggle
Democratic Party
Garuda Party
Indonesian Unity and Justice Party
Nasdem Party
National Awakening Party
National Mandate Party

Iranian Reformists
Democracy Party (Council for Coordinating the Reforms Front)
Moderation and Development Party
National Front (Iranian dissidents)

Al-Wataniya
Gorran Movement
Iraqi Constitutional Monarchy
New Generation Movement
People's Party
Victory Alliance

Fianna Fáil

Blue and White
Dor
Gesher
Israel Resilience Party
Pirate Party of Israel
Telem
Yesh Atid

Action
Alliance of the Centre (Centre-right coalition)
Associative Movement Italians Abroad
Centrists for Europe (Centre-left coalition)
Christian Popular Union (Centre-left coalition)
Coraggio Italia (Centre-right coalition)
Democratic Centre (Centre-left coalition)
Edelweiss
For Our Valley
For the Autonomies
For the Autonomy
Italian Liberal Party
Italy is Popular
Italy of Values
Italia Viva
Ladin Autonomist Union
More Europe
New Italian Socialist Party (Centre-right coalition)
Now Sicily (Centre-right coalition)
Party of Sardinians
Popular Alternative
Sardinian Reformers
Slovene Union
South Tyrolean People's Party
Team K
Trentino Tyrolean Autonomist Party
Union for Trentino
Union of the Centre
Us with Italy
Valdostan Union
Volt Italia

Rally of Houphouëtists for Democracy and Peace
Union for Democracy and Peace in Ivory Coast

J 

Constitutional Democratic Party of Japan
Dainiin Club
Democratic Party for the People
Komeito

Rescue and Partnership Party

K 

El Tıregı
Nur Otan

Amani National Congress (National Super Alliance)
New Forum for the Restoration of Democracy–Kenya
United Democratic Forum Party

Alternative, The
Independent Liberal Party
Liberal Party of Kosovo
New Democratic Initiative of Kosovo
New Kosovo Alliance
Parliamentary Party of Kosovo

Bir Bol
Kyrgyzstan
Onuguu–Progress
Respublika

L 

Development/For!
Izaugsme
Latvian Association of Regions
Latvian Farmers' Union
Union of Greens and Farmers
United for Latvia

Azm Movement (March 8 Alliance)
Democratic Renewal (March 14 Alliance)
Lebanese Option Party
Lebanese Peace Party (March 14 Alliance)
National Bloc
Progressive Socialist Party

All Basotho Convention

Unity Party

Democratic Party
Ihya Libya
National Centrist Party
Union for Homeland

Patriotic Union

Freedom Party
Labour Party
Lithuanian Centre Party
Lithuanian Farmers and Greens Union
Lithuanian Green Party
Lithuanian List

Christian Social People's Party
Democratic Party
Volt Luxembourg

M 

New Hope (Pro-democracy camp
New Macau Association (Pro-democracy camp

Movement for the Progress of Madagascar

Democratic Progressive Party
United Democratic Front
United Transformation Movement

Homeland Fighters' Party
Malaysian Nation Party
Malaysian United Democratic Alliance
Malaysian United Party
Parti Gerakan Rakyat Malaysia (Gabungan Rakyat Sabah, Perikatan Nasional)
Parti Rakyat Sarawak (Gabungan Parti Sarawak)
Parti Sarawak Bersatu
People's Alternative Party
Sarawak United Peoples' Party (Gabungan Parti Sarawak)

Union for the Republic and Democracy

Volt Malta

Liberal Vannin Party

El Wiam
Union for the Republic
Union of the Forces of Progress

Militant Socialist Movement

Institutional Revolutionary Party
New Alliance Party

Our Party
Rally for the Monegasque Family

National Union for the Future of Monaco
Union for the Principality
Union Monégasque

Civil Will–Green Party

In Black and White
Civis
Peace is Our Nation
Democratic Montenegro
DEMOS
Party of United Pensioners and the Disabled

National Rally of Independents
Party of Hope

Wa Democratic Party

N 

Bibeksheel Sajha Party
Lok Kalyankari Janta Party Nepal
Nepal Bahudal Party
Nepali Congress

50PLUS
Christian Democratic Appeal
Christian Union
Democrats 66
Henk Krol List
JONG
Independent Senate Group
Liberal Democratic Party
NLBeter
Party for the North
Party for Zeeland
Splinter
Volt Netherlands

Future Together

Integrity Party of Aotearoa New Zealand
Māori Party
New Zealand TEA Party
Opportunities Party, The
Sustainable New Zealand Party

Action Democratic Party

Citizen Option for Macedonia (VMRO-DPMNE)
Democratic Party of Turks (Social Democratic Union of Macedonia)
Democratic Renewal of Macedonia
Liberal Democratic Party
Liberal Party of Macedonia
Party for a European Future
Party of United Pensioners and Citizens of Macedonia (Social Democratic Union of Macedonia)

People's Party

Alliance Party of Northern Ireland

Árja
Centre Party
Christian Democratic Party
Liberal Party

P 

All Pakistan Muslim League
Awami Muslim League
Balochistan Awami Party
Grand Democratic Alliance
Muttahida Qaumi Movement – Pakistan
Pakistan Awami Tehreek
Pakistan Muslim League (Q)
Pakistan Tehreek-e-Insaf

Third Way 

Authentic Radical Liberal Party
Beloved Fatherland Party

American Popular Revolutionary Alliance
Let's Go Peru
Popular Action
Purple Party

Aksyon Demokratiko
Laban ng Demokratikong Pilipino
Lakas–CMD
Sarangani Reconciliation and Reformation Organization
Liberal Party
Malay Democrats of the Philippines
National Unity Party
Partido Abe Kapampangan
United Negros Alliance

Alliance of Democrats
Civic Platform (Civic Coalition)
Direct Democracy
German Minority Electoral Committee
Modern (Civic Coalition)
Poland 2050
Polish Coalition
Polish People's Party
Union of European Democrats
Polish Pirate Party
Silesian Autonomy Movement

 
National Democratic Alternative
Together for the People
Volt Portugal

Popular Democratic Party

R 

Save Romania Union
Volt Romania

Yabloko
A Just Russia
Agrarian Party of Russia

S 

Windward Islands People's Movement

Scottish Liberal Democrats
Volt Scotland

Democratic Party
Liberal Democratic Party
New Party

Democratic Party

Progressive Slovakia
For the People

Modern Centre Party

Democratic Alliance

Democratic Party of Korea
Minsaeng Party
People Party
Open Democratic Party

Canarian Coalition
Ciudadanos 
Basque National Party  
Regionalist Party of Cantabria  
Aragonese Party  
Volt Spain  

Centre Party
Volt Sweden

Centre, The
Green Liberal Party of Switzerland
Volt Switzerland

T 

Taiwan People's Party
People First Party
Non-Partisan Solidarity Union

People's National Movement

Independent Turkey Party
Liberal Democratic Party
Good Party
Democracy and Progress Party

U 

Servant of the People
Opposition Platform — For Life
European Solidarity
All-Ukrainian Union "Fatherland"
Voice
Opposition Bloc
Strong Ukraine

 (Great Britain only)
Liberal Democrats
Liberal Party (UK, 1989)
Renew
Volt UK

 
Forward Party
Reform Party
Democratic Party (factions)
Blue Dog Coalition
New Democrat Coalition
Republican Party (factions)
Republican Main Street Partnership
American Solidarity Party

Colorado Party
Independent Party

V 

Democratic Unity Roundtable
Democratic Action
Popular Will

W 

Welsh Liberal Democrats

Y 

General People's Congress

Z 

United Party for National Development

Former
Andorra - Andorran Democratic Centre
Armenia - Pan-Armenian National Movement
Australia - Australia Party, Liberal Movement, New Liberal Movement, Pirate Party Australia, Protectionist Party, Unity Party
Austria - Liberal Forum
Barbados - National Democratic Party
Belarus - All-Belarusian Unity and Accord Party, Belarusian Popular Party, European Coalition Free Belarus
Bermuda - Bermuda Democratic Alliance, United Bermuda Party
Bosnia and Herzegovina - Union of Reform Forces of Yugoslavia
Botswana - Botswana Workers Front
Brazil - Liberal Party, Party of the Nation's Retirees, Republican Party, Rio-grandense Republican Party, Social Democratic Party, Social Labour Party, Workers' General Party
Bulgaria - Bulgarian Agrarian National Union
Cambodia - Cambodia National Rescue Party, Candlelight Party
Canada - AffiliationQuebec, Consensus Ontario, Democratic Reform British Columbia, Forum Party of Alberta, Montreal Citizens' Movement, Progressive Conservative Party of Canada, Senate Liberal Caucus, Electors' Action Movement, The, Union Montreal, Unionist Party, United Party of Canada
Cayman Islands - Cayman Democratic Party
Chile - Democrat Party
Cuba - Democratic Solidarity Party, Liberal Party of Cuba
Czech Republic - Association of Radicals for the United States of Europe, Civic Movement, Movement for Autonomous Democracy–Party for Moravia and Silesia
Czechoslovakia - Freedom Party, Jewish Party, National Labour Party, Public Against Violence
Denmark - Centre Democrats, Forward, National Party
Egypt - National Democratic Party, Saadist Institutional Party
Estonia - Estonian Biodiversity Party
Finland - Finnish People's Unity Party
France - Cap21, Feuillant, Monarchiens
Germany
Divided Germany - All-German People's Party, German Forum Party
Nazi Germany - German State Party
Weimar Republic - German Democratic Party, National Liberal Party
German Empire - Free-minded Union
Greece - Centre Union, Centre Union – New Forces, Democratic Alliance, French Party, Liberal Party, Liberals, The, National Progressive Center Union, National Unionist Party, River, The
Hong Kong - Reform Club of Hong Kong
Hungary - Alliance of Free Democrats, Civic Freedom Party, Independent Hungarian Democratic Party, Together
Iceland - Union of Liberals and Leftists
Israel  - Center Party, Democratic Movement, Democratic Movement for Change, Gesher – Zionist Religious Centre, Hatnua, Hetz, Independent Liberals, Israeli Liberal Party, Kadima, Kulanu, National Home, National List, Progressive Party, Sephardim and Oriental Communities, Shinui, Tafnit, Telem, Third Way, Yahad
Japan - Constitutional Democratic Party (Japan, 1927), New Frontier Party (Japan), Democratic Party of Japan
South Korea - National Congress for New Politics, Democratic Party (South Korea, 2000), United New Democratic Party, Democratic Party (South Korea, 2008), Democratic Party (South Korea, 2011)See the article: Liberalism in South Korea
Spain - Union Progress and Democracy, Union of the Democratic Centre, Democratic and Social Centre, Radical Republican Party,  Party of the Democratic Centre, Constitutional Party, Liberal Union 
United Kingdom - Change UK, Liberal Party, Social Democratic Party, Whigs

See also 
List of right-wing political parties
List of left-wing political parties
List of syncretic political parties

Politics
Centrism
Centre-left
Centre-right
Third way
Liberalism
Social liberalism

Parties
New Democrats 
New Labour
Centre Party (disambiguation)
Liberal party
Democratic Party
Liberal International
Alliance of Democrats

References

Centrist